San Gottardo may refer to:

 San Gottardo, Italian for Gotthard Pass, mountain pass in the Alps
 San Gottardo, Italian for Gotthard of Hildesheim, German bishop venerated as a saint
 San Gottardo Altarpiece, oil on canvas painting by Giovanni Cariani
 San Gottardo, Milan, church in Milan, northern Italy
 Tremola San Gottardo, road in the Canton of Ticino, Switzerland

See also 

 Gottardo (disambiguation)